Diana was a 54-gun frigate of the Portuguese Navy. She was captured at the Battle of the Tagus and incorporated in the French Navy as Diane.

Career

Notes and references

Notes

References

 Fragata Diana. (Arquivo Histórico da Marinha).

Bibliography 
 

1820s ships
Age of Sail frigates of France
Ships built in Portugal
Frigates of the French Navy
Frigates of the Portuguese Navy
Frigates of Portugal
Captured ships